Star! (re-titled Those Were the Happy Times for its 1969 re-release) is a 1968 American biographical musical film directed by Robert Wise and starring Julie Andrews. The screenplay by William Fairchild is based on the life and career of British performer Gertrude Lawrence.

Plot
The film opens in 1940, with Lawrence in a screening room watching a documentary film chronicling her life, then flashes back to Clapham in 1915, when she leaves home to join her vaudevillian father in a dilapidated Brixton music hall. Eventually she joins the chorus in André Charlot's West End revue. She reunites with close childhood friend Noël Coward, who provides witty commentary on Gertie's actions.

Charlot becomes annoyed with Gertie's efforts to stand out, literally, from the chorus. He threatens to fire her, but stage manager Jack Roper intercedes and gets her hired as a general understudy to the leads.  She marries Jack, but it becomes clear she is more inclined to perform onstage than stay home and play wife. While pregnant, she insists on going on for an absent star, and captivates the audience with her own star-making performance of "Burlington Bertie". Charlot and Roper witness the audience's warm approval, and both realize, Charlot grudgingly and Roper wistfully, that Gertie belongs on the stage.

After their daughter Pamela is born, Gertrude is angered when Roper takes the baby on a pub crawl, and leaves him. A subsequent courtship with Sir Anthony Spencer, an English nobleman, polishes Gertie's rough edges and transforms her into a lady. Caught at a chic supper club when she is supposed to be on a sick day, she is fired from the Charlot Revue. Squired by Spencer, she becomes a 'society darling'. Coward then convinces Charlot to feature her in his new production, and she is finally recognized as a star. When the revue opens in New York City, she dallies with an actor and a banker, bringing the number of her suitors to three.

Gertrude faces financial ruin after spending all her considerable earnings, but ultimately manages to pay back her creditors and retain her glamour. As her career soars, her long-distance relationship with her daughter deteriorates. When Pamela cancels an anticipated holiday with Gertie, she gets extremely drunk and insults a roomful of people at a surprise birthday party thrown by Coward. Among the people insulted at the party is American theatre producer Richard Aldrich. When he returns to escort the hungover star home, he gives an honest appraisal of her. She is insulted, then intrigued by him, making an unannounced visit to his Cape Playhouse where she proposes to play the lead. They argue at rehearsal. He proposes marriage; she throws him out.

Back on Broadway, she has trouble getting a handle on a crucial "The Saga of Jenny" number in Lady in the Dark. Aldrich turns up at a daunting rehearsal where he observes her frustration and takes her, with Coward, out to a nightclub. She protests, then realizes the kind of performance they are watching is the key to her dilemma in the show. Coward pronounces him "a very clever man". After a rousing performance of "Jenny", the film ends with her marriage to Aldrich, eight years before her triumph in The King and I and untimely death from liver cancer at the age of 54.

Cast

 Julie Andrews as Gertrude Lawrence
 Richard Crenna as Richard Aldrich
 Michael Craig as Sir Anthony Spencer
 Daniel Massey as Noël Coward
 Robert Reed as Charles Fraser
 Bruce Forsyth as Arthur Lawrence
 Beryl Reid as Rose
 John Collin as Jack Roper
 Alan Oppenheimer as André Charlot
 Richard Karlan as David Holtzmann, Gertrude's attorney
 Lynley Laurence as Billie Carleton
 Garrett Lewis as Jack Buchanan
 Anthony Eisley as Ben Mitchell
 Jock Livingston as Alexander Woollcott
 J. Pat O'Malley as Dan
 Harvey Jason as Bert
 Matilda Calnan as Dorothy
 Peter Church as Narrator (voice only)
 Jenny Agutter as Pamela Roper (uncredited)
 Don Crichton as 'Limehouse Blues' dance partner (uncredited)
 Bernard Fox as Assistant to Lord Chamberlain (uncredited)
 Paul Harris as Soldier (uncredited)
 Anna Lee as Hostess (uncredited)
 Tony Lo Bianco as New York reporter (uncredited)
 Damian London as Jerry Paul (uncredited)
 Lester Matthews as Lord Chamberlain (uncredited)

Musical numbers
 Overture (Medley: Star!/Someone to Watch Over Me/Jenny/Dear Little Boy/Limehouse Blues)
 Star!
 Piccadilly
 Oh, it's a Lovely War 
 In My Garden of Joy 
 Forbidden Fruit (not on LP, added to end of CD)
 N' Everything
 Burlington Bertie from Bow
 Parisian Pierrot
 Limehouse Blues
 Someone to Watch Over Me
 Dear Little Boy (Dear Little Girl) 
 Entr'acte – Star! instrumental (not on LP soundtrack or CD)
 Someday I'll Find You
 The Physician
 Do, Do, Do
 Has Anybody Seen our Ship?
 My Ship
 The Saga of Jenny
 Main Title – Star! instrumental (not on LP soundtrack or CD)
 Star! – Extended Version – (originally released as a 45 rpm single; added to the end of the CD; used with director/producer's approval to underscore cast of characters roll for the VHS/Laserdisc release)

Production
According to extensive production details provided in the DVD release of the film, when Julie Andrews signed on to star in The Sound of Music, her contract with Twentieth Century-Fox was a two-picture deal. As The Sound of Music neared completion, director Robert Wise and producer Saul Chaplin had grown so fond of her that they wanted to make sure that their team would be the one to pick up the studio's option for the other picture "before anybody else got to her first".

Wise's story editor Max Lamb suggested a biopic of Lawrence and, although Andrews previously had rejected offers to portray the entertainer, she was as keen to work with Wise and Chaplin again as they were to work with her, and she subsequently warmed to their approach to the story. She signed for $1 million against 10 percent of the gross plus 35 cents for each soundtrack album sold.

Once Andrews was on board, Wise bought the rights to both Lawrence's 1945 autobiography A Star Danced and her widower's 1954 memoir Gertrude Lawrence as Mrs. A. Max Lamb did extensive research, including numerous interviews with people who actually had known Lawrence. Wise and Lamb believed the interviews provided a more accurate account than the material in the books, so the interviews became the basis of the screenplay. Wise felt it was important to hire a British screenwriter, and he decided on William Fairchild. The contrast between text in the books and the stories from the interviews found its way into the script, which initially had an animated Lawrence telling the story while the live version played out what (more or less) really happened. Eventually, Fairchild suggested Lawrence's story be told in (color) flashback while she watched a (black-and-white) documentary about her life, thus allowing the real Lawrence, who is seen on a set that is designed to be a screening room, to comment on the veracity of the fictionalized Lawrence in the film within the film.

Fairchild's screenplay renamed, replaced or combined some real people, for dramatic and legal reasons. Two of Lawrence's closest friends, Noël Coward and Beatrice Lillie, were approached regarding the rights to portray them in the film. While Coward was generally supportive, suggesting only small alterations to his character's dialogue, Lillie had a manager who demanded that she play herself, in addition to numerous script changes that enlarged her role. Wise then asked Fairchild to find the name of another female performer Lawrence had worked with who was already dead. Billie Carleton became the composite character that replaced Lillie in the film. When Lawrence reconnects with her wayward father in the film, he is performing in music halls with a mature woman who joins him when he departs for a job in South Africa. In reality Lawrence's father's girlfriend was a chorus girl not much older than Lawrence, and she remained in the United Kingdom while he went overseas.  On the screen, Lawrence's first husband Jack Roper is roughly her age, whereas in real life his name was Francis Gordon-Howley and he was twenty years her senior. Her upper-class Guardsman boyfriend, actually Capt. Philip Astley, is identified as Sir Tony Spencer on-screen, and the Wall Street financier named Ben Mitchell in the film was really Bert Taylor.

Daniel Massey, who portrayed Noël Coward, was Coward's godson in real life. His performance earned one of the seven Academy Award nominations for the film. In his commentary for the laserdisc and DVD release of the film, Massey reveals he was unhappy with the sound of his voice when he saw the film for the first time. As production wrapped in late 1967, he—at his own request—re-dubbed all of his dialogue before returning home to London. Massey's commentary also recounts a conversation in which Coward addressed his own sexual orientation, which is barely hinted at in the film. Massey quotes Coward saying "I've tried it all, from soup to nuts... ." Massey believed Coward preferred the latter.

Michael Kidd choreographed the musical sequences. Both he and Andrews have talked about his pushing her beyond what she thought her limits were, particularly for "Burlington Bertie" and "Jenny"—which turned out to be among her best moments on film. Andrews has said that her lasting friendship with Kidd and his dance assistant and wife Shelah is one of the things she valued most from the experience. Boris Leven was responsible for the production design and his sets took over nine different stages on the Fox lot. Fashion designer Donald Brooks designed 3,040 individual costumes for the film, including a record 125 outfits for Andrews alone. The $750,000 cost of Andrews' wardrobe was subsidized by Western Costume company, which took ownership after filming.  Western rented them out to many subsequent TV and movie productions, (including Funny Lady) for over 20 years, then auctioned most of them, along with hundreds of other famous costumes, at Butterfield & Butterfield's in West Hollywood.

Theatrical release
The film had its world premiere on July 18, 1968 at the Dominion Theatre in London, replacing The Sound of Music, which had played for three years at the theatre.

At a time when the popularity of roadshow theatrical releases in general, and musicals in particular, was on the wane, the United States was one of the later countries in which the film was released. When the film was in production, 15,000 people responded to promotional ads placed by 20th Century Fox for advance ticket sales in New York City, but a year later, when the studio followed up by mailing them order forms, only a very small percentage bought tickets. Sales were higher for Wednesday matinees than for Saturday nights, indicating that a crucial component—young adults—would not be a large part of the picture's audience. The film opened in the U.S. with little advance sale and good-to-mediocre reviews.

Star! was a commercial disappointment in its initial run, suffering about 20 minutes of studio-requested and director-approved cuts while still in its roadshow engagements. Hoping to recoup some of its estimated $14 million cost, 20th Century Fox executive Richard Zanuck decided to do some primitive "market research" (testing three titles: "Music for the Lady", "Those Were the Happy Days" and "Star!") before withdrawing the film in the spring of 1969. The studio proceeded to substantially cut and re-market the film under the new title Those Were the Happy Times. Wise, who did not believe cutting the film would work, declined to be involved in the editing, and asked that the credit "A Robert Wise Film" be removed. Following instructions from Zanuck, William H. Reynolds, the film's original editor, reluctantly but very competently removed scenes and whole sequences, including many of the musical numbers, paring the film's running time from 175 to 120 minutes, (which involved overlapping sound and adding a new shot to bridge some cuts). A very simple new title card was created as well. However, when the short retitled version was released in the fall of 1969, the changes left some holes in the plot, and did little to improve box-office receipts. The fact that the reissue was to be shown only in 35mm coincidentally saved the original camera negative of the film from being altered.

Box Office
By September 1970 Fox estimated the film had lost the studio $15,091,000.

Critical reception
Renata Adler of The New York Times observed "A lot of the sets are lovely, Daniel Massey acts beautifully as a kind of warmed Nöel Coward, and the film, which gets richer and better as it goes along, has a nice scene from Private Lives. People who like old-style musicals should get their money's worth. So should people who like Julie Andrews. But people who liked Gertrude Lawrence had better stick with their record collections and memories."

Variety wrote "Julie Andrews' portrayal...occasionally sags between musical numbers but the cast and team of redoubtable technical contributors have helped to turn out a pleasing tribute to one of the theatre's most admired stars. It gives a fascinating coverage of Lawrence's spectacular rise to showbiz fame, and also a neatly observed background of an epoch now gone."

Time Out London wrote "Wise's biopic hardly deserved the rough treatment it received from most critics and audiences, who had been led by the studio's advertising to expect another Sound of Music. This was a far more ambitious project; it backfired, but it backfired with a certain amount of honour. Daniel Massey's mincing portrayal of his godfather Noël Coward wins hands down over all the other impersonations."

TV Guide thought "it deserved a better fate for its enormous score, top-flight production, excellent choreography, and fine acting".

Kevin Thomas of the Los Angeles Times described the film as "stylish, sharp-edged, and underrated".

Awards and nominations

Television and home video

The film debuted on American television in a truncated form, but with its original title.  Within a week, it was broadcast in the United Kingdom at its original length, with only the overture and entr'acte eliminated.

One unusual feature about the uncut original version of the film was that, like many released today, it had no opening credits. The only credits seen at the beginning were fictitious – those of the newsreel film within the film – about Gertrude Lawrence, which, after an onscreen overture, is the first thing the audience viewing the film sees. The Twentieth Century-Fox logo was seen only as part of that newsreel, not as part of the actual film, and appeared only in black-and-white.  Director Robert Wise had to obtain special permission for putting the main title credits at the end of the film.  Initially there were no cast of characters credits which would typically come at the end because (like Fantasia and Apocalypse Now) a special program was to be given to the audience.  However at the last minute, a cast of characters roll was added.  Because of its late inclusion, it was not scored, a detail that was corrected for the first laserdisc and VHS release after consulting with the producer and director.  The music used came from the instrumental bridge and second verse of the title song as originally released on a 45RPM single record.

After the complete version had been unseen and thought lost for nearly 20 years, the rental library Films, Inc. had a new 35mm mono print struck in the late 80s.  Numerous screenings on the revival theatre circuit, a two-part article in a movie collector newspaper, and a worldwide letter writing campaign by fans, were followed by an article in Premiere Magazine, an acclaimed debut of the complete version on US cable TV, and a long-awaited release on home video.  All this attention has earned Star! a reputation as an underrated "lost classic" and a cult favorite.

After being transferred to video with the director's supervision in 1993, a new 35mm print was struck for the 25th Anniversary screening in November at the Directors Guild of America Theatre in Hollywood, CA.  This print carried the new Dolby Stereo soundtrack created for the video and laserdisc, which mixed down from the original six channel magnetic soundtrack (Screen Left, Left Center, Center, Right Center, Screen Right and Audience Surround) to four channels (Screen Left, Center, Screen Right, and Audience Surround).  The gala screening reunited many cast members with the Director Robert Wise, Producer Saul Chaplin, Choreographer Michael Kidd, Dance Assistant Shelah Hackett Kidd, and Julie Andrews, who was welcomed by a standing ovation from a packed house.

While the initial US video release (on VHS and Laserdisc) featured a transfer of the entire 176 minute film (from the original 65mm camera negative and six-channel magnetic soundtrack), the DVD, mastered from 35mm elements, runs only 173 minutes, because Fox cut the intermission/entr'acte sequence.  The laserdisc received a very favorable review from Laserdisc Newsletter, however fans have since written in online reviews and home theatre forums criticizing the DVD for, among other things, loss of the intermission/entr'acte, inaccurate framing, sound mix, and color (particularly the sepia tint the DVD added to the B&W sequences not being the original filmmakers' choice).  Long after laserdiscs stopped being a current format, fans have stated in some forums that they still preferred to watch the laserdisc rather than the DVD.

See also
 List of American films of 1968

References

External links
 
 
 
 

1968 musical films
1968 films
20th Century Fox films
American biographical films
American musical films
1960s English-language films
Films directed by Robert Wise
Films scored by Lennie Hayton
Films set in London
Films set in New York City
Films set in the 1910s
Films set in the 1940s
Musical films based on actual events
Films featuring a Best Supporting Actor Golden Globe winning performance
Biographical films about actors
1960s American films